The 1923 Mississippi gubernatorial election took place on November 6, 1923, in order to elect the Governor of Mississippi. Incumbent Democrat Lee M. Russell was term-limited, and could not run for reelection to a second term. As was common at the time, the Democratic candidate ran unopposed in the general election so therefore the Democratic primary was the real contest, and winning the primary was considered tantamount to election.

This gubernatorial election was the first in Mississippi that allowed women the right to vote.

Democratic primary
No candidate received a majority in the Democratic primary, which featured 5 contenders, so a runoff was held between the top two candidates. The runoff election was won by former Superintendent of Education Henry L. Whitfield, who defeated former Governor Theodore G. Bilbo.

Results

Runoff

General election
In the general election, Whitfield ran unopposed.

Results

References

1923
gubernatorial
Mississippi
November 1923 events